YSG may refer to:
 Yellow supergiant
 IATA code of Lutselk'e Airport